Some Assembly Required may refer to:

Television

Series 
 Some Assembly Required (2007 TV series), a Discovery Channel show
 Some Assembly Required (2014 TV series), TV series on Canadian channel YTV

Episodes 
 "Some Assembly Required" (Buffy the Vampire Slayer), a 1997 television episode
 "Some Assembly Required" (Dark Angel), an episode of the television series Dark Angel
 "Some Assembly Required" (Frasier episode), the nineteenth episode of the tenth season of Frasier
 "Some Assembly Required" (Arthur), an episode of Arthur
 "Some Assembly Required" (The Avengers: Earth's Mightiest Heroes),  episode of the animated television series The Avengers: Earth's Mightiest Heroes
 "Some Assembly Required", an episode of Handy Manny

Music 
 Some Assembly Required (album), a 2009 album by American rock band Assembly Of Dust
 "Some Assembly Required", a song by Mudvayne from Kill, I Oughtta
 Some Assembly Required (radio program), an American music radio program

Other uses 
 Spy Fox 2: "Some Assembly Required", a 1999 video game

See also

 Assembly Required (History Channel USA), a 2021-debut maker/inventor/tinkerer competition skills TV game show starring hosts April Wilkerson, Richard Karn, Tim Allen